Arnoud Hendriks (born 1949, The Hague) is a former Dutch figure skater.

Results

External links
results

1949 births 
Living people
Dutch male single skaters
Sportspeople from The Hague
20th-century Dutch people